A portacaval anastomosis or portocaval anastomosis is a specific type of circulatory anastomosis that occurs between the veins of the portal circulation and the vena cava, thus forming one of the principal types of portasystemic anastomosis or portosystemic anastomosis, as it connects the portal circulation to the systemic circulation, providing an alternative pathway for the blood. When there is a blockage of the portal system, portocaval anastomosis enables the blood to still reach the systemic venous circulation. The inferior end of the esophagus and the superior part of the rectum are potential sites of a harmful portocaval anastomosis.

In portal hypertension, as in the case of cirrhosis of the liver, the anastomoses become congested and form venous dilatations. Such dilatation can lead to esophageal varices and anorectal varices. Caput medusae can also result.

A portacaval shunt is analogous in that it diverts circulation; as with shunts and anastomoses generally, the terms are often used to refer to either the naturally occurring forms or the surgically created forms. 



Presentation
Clinical presentations of portal hypertension include:

A dilated inferior mesenteric vein may or may not be related to portal hypertension.
Other areas of anastomosis include the bare area of the liver as it connects to the diaphragm, the posterior portion of the gastrointestinal tract as it touches the posterior abdominal wall, the posterior surface of the pancreas, and the inferior part of the esophagus.

References

Vascular diseases
Diseases of veins, lymphatic vessels and lymph nodes